Judge Abrams may refer to:

Paul Lewis Abrams (born 1958), magistrate judge for the United States Central District of California
Ronnie Abrams (born 1968), judge of the United States District Court for the Southern District of New York

See also
Ruth Abrams (1930–2019), associate justice of the Massachusetts Supreme Judicial Court